Pennsylvania Route 218 (PA 218) is a  state highway and spur route of PA 18 located in Greene County, Pennsylvania. The southern terminus is at the West Virginia state line at Blacksville, WV, where the road continues into that state as West Virginia Route 218 (WV 218).

Route description

PA 218 begins at the West Virginia border in Wayne Township, where the road continues south into that state as WV 218. From the state line, the route heads north on two-lane undivided Smith Creek Road, passing through forested areas with a few clearings and rural homes. PA 218 continues through rural areas for several miles, passing through the community of Spraggs. The route continues through more forests and heads into Franklin Township. In Franklin Township, the road continues north through woodland with some farms and residences. PA 218 reaches the community of Blairtown and crosses the South Fork Tenmile Creek into the borough of Waynesburg. Here, the road becomes South Morgan Street and crosses Norfolk Southern's Mon Line, heading into residential and commercial areas. PA 218 reaches its northern terminus at an intersection with US 19/PA 21 in the commercial center of Waynesburg.

Major intersections

See also

References

External links

Pennsylvania Highways: PA 218

218
Transportation in Greene County, Pennsylvania